Little Pine 116 is an Indian reserve of the Little Pine First Nation in Saskatchewan. It is 53 kilometres northwest of North Battleford. In the 2016 Canadian Census, it recorded a population of 700 living in 201 of its 220 total private dwellings. In the same year, its Community Well-Being index was calculated at 50 of 100, compared to 58.4 for the average First Nations community and 77.5 for the average non-Indigenous community.

References

Indian reserves in Saskatchewan
Division No. 13, Saskatchewan